Rib Lake may refer to:

 Rib Lake, Wisconsin, village in Taylor County, Wisconsin, United States
 Rib Lake (town), Wisconsin, town in Taylor County, Wisconsin, United States
 Rib Lake (Ontario),  lake in Northeastern Ontario, Canada